La Misión is a town and one of the 84 municipalities of Hidalgo, in central-eastern Mexico. The municipality covers an area of 179.9 km2.
The first Spanish colonisers named the town "Cibola", and it was later named "The Mission" by the Franciscan friars that arrived there in later years.

As of 2005, the municipality had a total population of 10,096.

See also
Cerro Prieto, Hidalgo

References

Municipalities of Hidalgo (state)
Populated places in Hidalgo (state)